Duke of Leinster  is a title in the Peerage of Ireland and the premier dukedom in that peerage. The subsidiary titles of the Duke of Leinster are: Marquess of Kildare (1761), Earl of Kildare (1316), Earl of Offaly (1761), Viscount Leinster, of Taplow in the County of Buckingham (1747), Baron of Offaly (c. 1193), Baron Offaly (1620) and Baron Kildare, of Kildare in the County of Kildare (1870). The viscounty of Leinster is in the Peerage of Great Britain, the barony of Kildare in the Peerage of the United Kingdom, and all other titles in the Peerage of Ireland. The courtesy title of the eldest son and heir of the Duke of Leinster is Marquess of Kildare. The Duke of Leinster is the head of the House of Kildare.

The 3rd Duke of Schomberg, General and K.G. (1641-1719), was created The 1st Duke of Leinster in 1691. However, that creation became extinct upon Schomberg's death in July 1719. For the second creation, it was granted to James FitzGerald, 1st Duke of Leinster, who married to Lady Emily Lennox, the great-granddaughter of King Charles II of the Royal House of Stuart.

The family seat of the current Duke of Leinster is now Oakley Park, near Abingdon, Oxfordshire. He succeeded as 9th Duke of Leinster, 9th Marquess of Kildare, 28th Earl of Kildare, 9th Earl of Offaly, 9th Viscount Leinster of Taplow, 14th Baron Offaly, 6th Baron Kildare, and as the Premier Duke, Marquess and Earl in the Peerage of Ireland.

Earls of Kildare from 1316
This branch of the Cambro Norman FitzGerald/FitzMaurice dynasty, which came to Ireland in 1169, were initially created Earls of Kildare. The earldom was created in 1316 for John FitzGerald. Two senior FitzGeralds, Garret Mór FitzGerald and his son, Garret Óg FitzGerald served as Lords Deputy of Ireland, the representative of the Lord of Ireland (the King of England) in Ireland. The tenth earl, Thomas FitzGerald, known as Silken Thomas, was attainted and his honours were forfeit in 1537. In 1554, Thomas's half-brother and only male heir, Gerald FitzGerald, was created Earl of Kildare in the Peerage of Ireland. He was subsequently restored to the original letters patent in 1569, as 11th earl. The second (1554-created) earldom became extinct in 1599, although the original earldom survived.

Dukes of Leinster from 1766 

The family was originally based in Maynooth Castle in Maynooth in County Kildare. In later centuries the family owned estates in Waterford with their country residence being a Georgian house called Carton House which had replaced the castle in County Kildare. In Dublin, the Earl built a large townhouse residence on the southside of Dublin called Kildare House. When the Earl was awarded a dukedom and became Duke of Leinster, the house was renamed Leinster House. One of its occupants was Lord Edward FitzGerald, who became an icon for Irish nationalism through his involvement with the Irish Rebellion of 1798, which ultimately cost him his life.

Leinster House was sold by the Leinsters in 1815. After nearly a century as the headquarters of the Royal Dublin Society, which held its famed Spring Show and Horse Show in its grounds, Oireachtas Éireann, the two chamber parliament of the new Irish Free State, rented Leinster House in 1922 to be its temporary parliament house. In 1924 it bought the building for parliamentary use. It has remained the parliament house of the Irish state.

The Dukes of Leinster had by the early 20th century lost all their property and wealth. Their Carton House seat was sold (though one of Ireland's most historic buildings with perfectly preserved 18th century grounds, it was controversially turned into a hotel and golf course in the late 1990s by the current owner in an act condemned by environmentalists), as later on was their other residence in Waterford. The family now live in a smaller property in Ramsden, Oxfordshire.

Title dispute
A controversial claim by claimants who say they are descended from the 5th Duke, which is reported to have been largely debunked by Michael Estorick in 1981, was made in 2006 and subsequently failed.

In 2005, a lawsuit was filed with HMG's Department of Constitutional Affairs by Theresa Pamella Caudill, daughter of Eleanor and Maurice F. “Desmond” FitzGerald, on behalf of her nephew, a California builder, Paul FitzGerald, as claimant to be the rightful Duke of Leinster. FitzGerald was claimed to be the grandson of Major Lord Desmond FitzGerald (1888–1916), the second son of The 5th Duke of Leinster, who was recorded as having been killed in action during the First World War, while serving with the Irish Guards. When Maurice, 6th Duke of Leinster, died, mad and childless, in February 1922, the Leinster dukedom and its considerable wealth and estates devolved upon his youngest brother, Lord Edward FitzGerald, who succeeded as 7th Duke. However, Paul FitzGerald’s supporters claim that Lord Desmond faked his death and emigrated to California, by way of Winnipeg, Canada, where he lived until his death in 1967. It was further claimed by Mrs Caudill that a package of documents, witnessed by Edward, Prince of Wales (later Edward VIII), Sir Edgar Vincent, and Lord Feversham, had been lodged by her father with the Crown Office of the House of Lords in 1929, and the family had been denied access to them. Mrs Caudill believed the documents included evidence that her father agreed to relinquish the title for one generation but made it clear it was to be passed down to his son, her brother Leonard FitzGerald. Instead, it was passed down through her father's brother's family. It was alleged that an archivist had acknowledged the package had once existed, but the official line was that it was now lost.

In February 2006, Lord Falconer of Thoroton, Lord Chancellor (2003–2007), and Harriet Harman, Minister of State in the Department for Constitutional Affairs, considered this claim. The claim was dismissed by Lord Falconer of Thoroton, despite a 30-year campaign by Paul FitzGerald's family reputedly costing £1.3 million. The Lord Chancellor adjudicated that the title was to remain with the existing holder, Maurice FitzGerald. Paul FitzGerald has a right of appeal against the Lord Chancellor's verdict by petitioning the monarch.

In 2010, however, DNA evidence was presented that indicates that Paul FitzGerald is related to the wife of the 5th Duke, the former Lady Hermione Duncombe. As reported in The Scotsman,
With the help of Dunfermline-based genealogist Lloyd Pitcairn, Mrs FitzGerald Caudill [Paul FitzGerald's aunt] traced Maud Crawford, the grand-daughter of Lady Hermione's younger sister Urica Duncombe.

The results of the tests found that it was "41 times more probable" that Ms Crawford and Paul FitzGerald were extremely closely related than were from different families. The proof that Paul FitzGerald is related to the titled family is the first DNA evidence ever produced in the case, and it strongly supports Mrs Fitz-Gerald Caudhill's long-held claim suggesting that her mysterious father was the son of Lady Hermione, the wife of the fifth Duke of Leinster.

Theresa Pamella Caudill died in 2016.

It had also previously been alleged that Edward FitzGerald, who succeeded as 7th Duke, was the biological son of the 11th Earl of Wemyss (1857–1937). Were this to be established, then neither the present Duke nor any other descendant of his grandfather, the 7th Duke, would be a legitimate heir of the 1st Duke of Leinster.

Earls of Kildare (1316)

Other titles: Baron of Offaly (c. 1193)
John FitzGerald, 1st Earl of Kildare (1250–1316), already 4th Baron of Offaly, was rewarded for serving Edward I of England in Scotland
Thomas FitzGerald, 2nd Earl of Kildare (died 1328), younger (only surviving) son of the 1st Earl
John FitzGerald (1314–1323), eldest son of the 2nd Earl, died in childhood
Richard FitzGerald, 3rd Earl of Kildare (1317–1329), second son of the 2nd Earl, died unmarried
Maurice FitzGerald, 4th Earl of Kildare (1318–1390), third and youngest son of the 2nd Earl
Gerald FitzGerald, 5th Earl of Kildare (died 1432), a son of the 4th Earl
The 5th Earl had at least one son Thomas, who predeceased him
John FitzGerald, 6th Earl of Kildare (de jure; d.c.1434), a younger son of the 4th Earl; he was forced to dispute his right to the title with a son-in-law of the 5th Earl
Thomas FitzGerald, 7th Earl of Kildare (died 1478), son of the 6th Earl
Gerald FitzGerald, 8th Earl of Kildare (c. 1456–1513), eldest son of the 7th Earl (Gearóid Mór FitzGerald)
Gerald FitzGerald, 9th Earl of Kildare (1487–1534), eldest son of the 8th Earl (Gearóid Óg Fitzgerald)
Thomas FitzGerald, 10th Earl of Kildare (died 1537), "Silken Thomas", eldest son of the 9th Earl, led an insurrection in Ireland and his honours were forfeit, and he died unmarried
Other titles (11th–13th Earls): Earl of Kildare and Baron of Offaly (1554)
Gerald FitzGerald, 11th Earl of Kildare (1525–1585), second son of the 9th Earl, was given a new creation in 1554 then restored to his brother's honours in 1569
Gerald (Garrett) FitzGerald, Lord Offaly (1559–1580), eldest son of the 11th Earl, predeceased his father without male issue
Henry FitzGerald, 12th Earl of Kildare (1562–1597), second son of the 11th Earl, died without male issue
William FitzGerald, 13th Earl of Kildare (died 1599), third and youngest son of the 11th Earl, died unmarried
Gerald FitzGerald, 14th Earl of Kildare (died 1612), elder son of Edward, himself third and youngest son of the 9th Earl
Gerald FitzGerald, 15th Earl of Kildare (1611–1620), only son of the 14th Earl, died in childhood
George FitzGerald, 16th Earl of Kildare (1612–1660), also 2nd Baron Offaly from 1658, a son of Thomas, himself younger brother of the 14th Earl, and the 1st Baroness Offaly
Wentworth FitzGerald, 17th Earl of Kildare (1634–1664), elder son of the 16th Earl
John FitzGerald, 18th Earl of Kildare (1661–1707), only son of the 17th Earl, died without surviving issue
Henry FitzGerald, Lord Offaly (1683–1684), only son of the 18th Earl, died in infancy
Robert FitzGerald, 19th Earl of Kildare (1675–1744), only son of Robert, himself younger son of the 16th Earl
Other titles (20th Earl): Viscount Leinster, of Taplow in the County of Buckingham (GB 1747)
James FitzGerald, 20th Earl of Kildare (1722–1773) was created Marquess of Kildare in 1761

Marquesses of Kildare (1761)
Other titles: Earl of Kildare (1316), Earl of Offaly (1761), Viscount Leinster, of Taplow in the County of Buckingham (GB 1747) and Baron of Offaly (c. 1193)
James FitzGerald, 1st Marquess of Kildare (1722–1773) was created Duke of Leinster in 1766
George FitzGerald, Earl of Offaly (1748–1765), eldest son of the 1st Marquess

Dukes of Leinster, second creation (1766)

Other titles: Marquesse of Kildare (1761), Earl of Kildare (1316), Earl of Offaly (1761), Viscount Leinster, of Taplow in the County of Buckingham (GB 1747), Baron Offaly (1620) and Baron of Offaly (c. 1193)
James FitzGerald, 1st Duke of Leinster (1722–1773), elder son of the 19th Earl
William Robert FitzGerald, 2nd Duke of Leinster (1749–1804), second son of the 1st Duke
George FitzGerald, Marquess of Kildare (1783–1784), eldest son of the 2nd Duke, died in infancy
Augustus Frederick FitzGerald, 3rd Duke of Leinster (1791–1874), second son of the 2nd Duke
Other titles (4th Duke onwards): Baron Kildare, of Kildare in the County of Kildare (UK 1870)
Charles William FitzGerald, 4th Duke of Leinster (1819–1887), eldest son of the 3rd Duke
Gerald FitzGerald, 5th Duke of Leinster (1851–1893), eldest son of the 4th Duke
Maurice FitzGerald, 6th Duke of Leinster (1887–1922), eldest son of the 5th Duke, died unmarried
Edward FitzGerald, 7th Duke of Leinster (1892–1976), third and youngest son of the 5th Duke
Gerald FitzGerald, 8th Duke of Leinster (1914–2004), only legitimate son of the 7th Duke
Maurice FitzGerald, 9th Duke of Leinster (born 1948), elder son of the 8th Duke
Thomas FitzGerald, Earl of Offaly (1974–1997), only son of the 9th Duke, died unmarried in a road traffic collision

The heir presumptive is the present holder's nephew Edward FitzGerald (born 1988), only son of Lord John FitzGerald (1952–2015)

Line of succession

 Charles FitzGerald, 4th Duke of Leinster (1819–1897)
 Gerald FitzGerald, 5th Duke of Leinster (1851–1893)
 Edward FitzGerald, 7th Duke of Leinster (1892–1976)
 Gerald FitzGerald, 8th Duke of Leinster (1914–2004)
 Maurice FitzGerald, 9th Duke of Leinster (born 1948)
Lord John FitzGerald (1952–2015)
(1) Edward FitzGerald (b. 1988)
Lord Charles FitzGerald (1859–1928)
Rupert Augustus FitzGerald (1900–1969)
(2) Peter Charles FitzGerald (b. 1925)
(3) Stephen Peter FitzGerald (b. 1953)

Family tree

Coat of arms

The coat of arms of the Dukes of Leinster derives from the legend that John FitzGerald, 1st Earl of Kildare, as a baby in Woodstock Castle, was trapped in a fire when a pet monkey rescued him. The FitzGeralds then adopted a monkey as their crest (and later supporters) and occasionally use the additional motto Non immemor beneficii (Not forgetful of a helping hand). The motto "Crom A Boo" comes from the medieval Croom Castle and "Abu", meaning "up" in Irish; Crom Abu was the FitzGeralds' medieval warcry. Crom (Croom) and Shanet (Shanid) were two castles about 16 miles apart in County Limerick, one being the seat of the Geraldines of Kildare, and the other that of the Geraldines of Desmond, whose distinctive war cries were accordingly “Crom-a-boo” and “Shanet-a-boo.” In 1495 an Act of Parliament was passed (10 Hen. VII. C. 20) “to abolish the words Crom-a-boo and Butler-a-boo.” The word “Abu” or “Aboo,” an exclamation of defiance, was the usual termination of the war cries in Ireland, as in a' buaidh, "to victory!" Saint Patrick's Saltire, a red saltire on a white field, may have been adapted from the Duke's arms on the 1783 creation of the Order of Saint Patrick, of which The 2nd Duke of Leinster was the senior founder knight.

Escutcheon: Argent a saltire gules.
Crest: A monkey statant proper environed about the middle with a plain collar and chained or.
Supporters: Two monkeys, environed and chained as in the crest.
Motto: Crom a boo (Now it would be spelt "Crom Abu". In English, "Up Croom", or "Croom to victory."

See also
Irish nobility
Baron Offaly
Baron Lecale
Baron Rayleigh
Baron de Ros
Earl of Desmond

References

Further reading
 
 
 

Dukedoms in the Peerage of Ireland
Leinster
Leinster
Lists of dukes in Ireland
Noble titles created in 1691
Noble titles created in 1766
Dukes of Leinster